Events in the year 2023 in Eswatini

Incumbents 

 Monarch (Ngwenyama): Mswati III
 Prime Minister: Cleopas Dlamini

Events 

Ongoing — COVID-19 pandemic in Eswatini, 2021-2022 Eswatini protests

 2023 Swazi general election

References 

 
2020s in Eswatini
Years of the 21st century in Eswatini
Eswatini
Eswatini